Erja Jokinen (born February 5, 1979) is a Finnish ski-orienteering competitor. She won a gold medal in the relay event at the 2004 World Ski Orienteering Championships. She received a total of eight silver and bronze medals at the World Championships in 2002, 2005 and 2007. Jokinen became Junior World Champion in 1998.

See also
 Finnish orienteers
 List of orienteers
 List of orienteering events

References

1979 births
Living people
Finnish orienteers
Female orienteers
Ski-orienteers